This is a list of members of the South Australian Legislative Council from 1855 to 1857. Sixteen members were elected at the 1855 election with terms due to expire in 1858. The four Official (i.e. holding offices – front bench) Nominees and four Non-Official Nominees were appointed by the Governor on behalf of the Crown. Voting was voluntary and restricted to land-holding males. This Council formulated a State Constitution and was prorogued to make way for the bicameral system brought about by this Constitution.

References

Members of South Australian parliaments by term
19th-century Australian politicians